In mathematics, a Marot ring, introduced by , is a commutative ring whose regular ideals are generated by regular elements.

References

Ring theory